Kaunerberg is a municipality in the district of Landeck in the Austrian state of Tyrol located 12.6 km southeast of Landeck in a valley with the same name at the upper course of the Inn River. The main source of income is agriculture.

References

Cities and towns in Landeck District